The Commissioners for Indian Affairs  were a group of officials of colonial Albany, New York charged with regulating the fur trade and dealing with the Iroquois.

History
Originally the local magistrates, functioning informally, performed these tasks as part of their official duties. In 1685, Governor Andros organized a board of commissioners, the same officials who had previously performed those duties.

This system was affirmed by charter granted to the City of Albany by Governor Thomas Dongan in 1686. In 1696, Governor Benjamin Fletcher appointed an independent board of four members to take over from the magistrates: Pieter Schuyler, Dirck Wesselse Ten Broeck, Domine Godfrey Dellius, and Evert Bancker. In 1698, Governor Bellomont dissolved the independent group and restored the functions to the city government. After this, however, the commissioners received a special commission from the governor. During King George's War (1744–1748), Governor Clinton preempted the authority of the Commissioners and appointed Sir William Johnson to deal with the Iroquois.

The Commissioners were headed by the Secretary for Indian Affairs. Until 1686, the office of Secretary was filled the Secretary of the Manor of Rensselaerswyck. Robert Livingston was appointed to this post in 1675. Robert Livingston the Younger took over from his uncle in 1710, followed by Philip Livingston from 1725 to 1749. Peter Wraxall was secretary from 1750 to 1759. Witham Marshe was secretary from 1759.

During the American Revolution the British Government took over management of Indian affairs from the colonists, and the commissioners ceased to function.

List of commissioners

See also
Bureau of Indian Affairs

References

External links
The Commissioners of Indian Affairs

Province of New York